For the Mexican football club Cruz Azul, the 2018–19 season is its 59th season in existence and its 55th consecutive season in the top tier of Mexican football. Cruz Azul will compete in Liga MX and Copa MX.

Kits

Apertura
Supplier: Under Armour

Clausura
Supplier: Joma

Season overview

October
On 31 October, Cruz Azul faced Monterrey in the Copa MX final in the Estadio BBVA Bancomer. Cruz Azul won the match 0–2, with goals from Hernández and Cauteruccio, clinching their fourth title.

December
On 13 December, Cruz Azul played the first leg of the Liga MX final against América which ended as a goalless draw. The second leg was played on 16 December with Cruz Azul losing the match 0–2. This was the first final with both legs played in the same stadium since Verano 2002.

January
Cruz Azul's four-year association with Under Armour ended with the Apertura 2018 season after being unable to reach an agreement on a new deal. Cruz Azul announced Joma as their new kit manufacturer on 1 January.

Players

Squad information

Last updated on 7 January 2019

Transfers and loans

Transfers in

Transfers out

Transfer listed

Pre-season and friendlies

Friendlies

Pre-Apertura

Apertura

Pre-Clausura

Competitions

Overview

Aggregate table
The aggregate table (the sum of points of both the Apertura and Clausura tournaments) will be used to determine the participants of the Apertura 2019 Copa MX. This table also displays teams that have qualified for the 2020 CONCACAF Champions League.

Apertura 2018

Liga MX

Standings

Results summary
Includes liguilla.

Results by round

Matches

Quarter-finals

Semi-finals

Final

Copa MX

On 5 June, Cruz Azul were drawn in Group 6 of the Copa MX alongside Liga MX club Atlas, and Ascenso MX club Zacatepec.

Group stage

Knockout stage

Round of 16

Quarter-finals

Semi-finals

Final

Clausura 2019

Liga MX

Standings

Results summary

Results by round

Matches

Quarter-finals

Copa MX

On 11 December, Cruz Azul were drawn in Group 5 of the Copa MX alongside Liga MX club León, and Ascenso MX club Oaxaca.

Group stage

Squad statistics

Appearances
Players with no appearances not included in the list.

Includes all competitive matches.

Goalscorers
Includes all competitive matches.

Clean sheets 
Includes all competitive matches.
Correct as of matches played on 16 February 2019

Disciplinary record

Includes all competitive matches.

Injury record

References
Citations

External links

Mexican football clubs 2018–19 season
Cruz Azul seasons
2018–19 in Mexican football